Joanna of Jülich (died 1394) was the youngest daughter of Duke William II and his wife, Marie of Guelders.

Marriage
In 1376, she married John V, Lord of Arkel (1362-1428).  They had two children:
 William (d. 1 December 1417 in Gorinchem)
 Maria (d. 1415, in IJsselstein), married John II, Count of Egmond

People from the Duchy of Jülich
Year of birth unknown
1394 deaths
Medieval Dutch nobility
Medieval Dutch women
14th-century German nobility
14th-century German women
14th-century women of the Holy Roman Empire